Douglas J. Cumming (born October 18, 1970) is a Canadian financial economist. He is the DeSantis Distinguished Professor of Finance and the Chair of the Finance Department at the College of Business, Florida Atlantic University and a Visiting Professor at the Birmingham Business School, University of Birmingham. Cumming specializes in financial market misconduct, financial technology (FinTech), entrepreneurial finance (including angel investment, venture capital, private debt, and private equity), mutual funds, hedge funds, entrepreneurship, international business, and law. In 2022, Cumming was listed as one of the top-92 cited scholars in the world in the area of business and economics.

Venture capital and private equity scholarship: Over 2001-2021, Cumming was the most frequently published academic author in the world in the area of venture capital and the third most cited author in the world on venture capital; also, he was the second most frequently published academic author in the world in the area of private equity and the most cited author in the world on private equity. Cumming's 2010 research in the Journal of International Business Studies, first presented at the European Finance Association in 2004, was the first to show that private equity fund managers exaggerate their expected returns reported to institutional investors on investments that have not yet been exited. Cumming’s work on government venture capital was influential in leading to a repeal of tax subsidies to labor-sponsored venture capital funds in Canada. Cumming's work from his 1999 PhD thesis and published in 2005 in the Journal of Business Venturing was the first to show that non-US venture capital funds, and US venture capital funds that invest outside the US, typically do not use convertible preferred securities. Cumming found similar evidence with European data that he published in the Review of Financial Studies in 2008 and European Economic Review in 2008. Cumming recounts the difficulty of publishing on this topic since it went against the conventional wisdom at the time, and how related issues have evolved into a segregated literature on entrepreneurial finance across finance versus management/entrepreneurship journals.

Crowdfunding and FinTech scholarship: Cumming is the most frequently cited author in the world that researches crowdfunding. Cumming's 2015 paper on equity crowdfunding is the first empirical study on the topic and the most often cited paper in the world on the topic. Cumming and his PhD student Robert Reardon created a U.S. securities crowdfunding tracker. Cumming and his coauthor Sofia Johan have created a university course on crowdfunding.

Financial market misconduct scholarship: Cumming has published many papers on stock exchange trading misconduct and trading rules, including the first paper on how differences in trading rules governing market manipulation across countries and over time affect liquidity published in the 2011 Journal of Financial Economics. Cumming's 2015 research in the Academy of Management Journal was the first to establish that board of director gender diversity gives rise to a reduction in the frequency and severity of securities fraud, as featured by the New York Times in April 2014. His most recent work in this area shows how rumors surrounding M&As cause harm to deals and their values, which he published in 2021 in the Journal of Financial Economics.

Personal life 
Cumming grew up in Winnipeg, Manitoba. He is the youngest of 7 children in his family. His father Gordon Rosevear Cumming was a cardiologist and an honored member of the Manitoba Sports Hall of Fame. His mother Dorothy Cumming was a nurse.

Cumming was a junior short track speedskater and competed in the 1987 North American Indoor Junior Championships and won the overall title, as well as two silver medals at the Canada Winter Games. Cumming has completed a number of marathons, including the 2001 Boston Marathon in a time of 3:05. Cumming is an active skateboarder and snowboarder.

Cumming is married to Sofia Johan and they have 2 children.

Education 
Cumming received a First Class Joint Honors Degree in Economics and Finance from the McGill University Faculty of Management, and was awarded the Sir Edward Beatty Medal and Cherry Prize in 1992. He received a Masters in Economics from Queen's University in 1993. He contemporaneously completed a J.D. in law at the University of Toronto Law School and a Ph.D. in Economics at the University of Toronto over the 5-year period 1994-1999. In 2002, Cumming was awarded the Chartered Financial Analyst (CFA) designation.

Career 
Right after his J.D./Ph.D., Cumming joined the University of Alberta School of Business as an Assistant Professor of Finance in 1999. In 2004, he joined the University of New South Wales School of Banking and Finance as an Associate Professor of Finance with tenure. In 2005, he joined Rensselaer Polytechnic Institute Lally School of Management as an Associate Professor of Finance with tenure. In 2007, Cumming joined the Schulich School of Business, York University as Associate Professor of Finance and Entrepreneurship and Ontario Research Chair. Cumming was promoted to Full Professor and  Ontario Research Chair at the Schulich School of Business in 2010. His Ontario Research Chair was renewed in 2014 for an additional 7-year term. From 2008-2016, Cumming served as the Director of the finance area PhD program at the Schulich School of Business.

In 2018, Cumming was appointed at the DeSantis Distinguished Professor of Finance and Entrepreneurship at Florida Atlantic University College of Business. Cumming served as the Director of the finance area PhD program from 2018-2022 at the Florida Atlantic University College of Business. Cumming was appointed as the Chair of the Finance Department at Florida Atlantic University College of Business in 2022. Cumming's former PhD students include Feng Zhan, Minjie Zhang, Dan Li, Yelin Zhang, and Rejo Peter. Cumming has been a Visiting Professor at the Birmingham Business School, University of Cambridge Judge Business School, Goethe University of Frankfurt, Kobe University, University of South Carolina Darla Moore School of Business, Royal Melbourne Institute of Technology, University of Macau, Politecnico Milano, the Shanghai University of International Business and Economics, Shanghai Lixin University of Accounting and Finance, Indian Institute of Management Shillong, and Nanyang University.

Cumming has worked as an expert witness on numerous litigation cases involving matters that include but are not limited to tax evasion, improper disclosure, financial accounting fraud, market manipulation (price manipulation, marking the close, layering, spoofing, wash trading, aggressive trading, pre-arranged trading, among others, using SMARTS computerized algorithmic technology/RegTech), hedge fund misconduct, mutual fund misconduct, valuation and disclosure in mergers and acquisitions, cancellation of dividends, market efficiency and damages, wrongful dismissal, and valuation of private enterprises backed by venture capital and private equity funds. Cumming has advised regulatory bodies in North America, Europe, and Australasia on financial market regulation, including matters pertaining to trading rules, surveillance, venture capital programs, taxation, and crowdfunding legislation.

Cumming has provided pro bono work for the Democracy Forward Foundation, offering advice on a brief pertaining to the NASDAQ Diversity Rule, mostly on the body of work that links diversity to fraud (pursuant to his 2015 Academy of Management Journal paper).

Cumming created a U.S. crowdfunding tracker page that was released in fall 2021 as part of a larger effort for a new FinTech minor that he led and championed in the fall 2021 for Florida Atlantic University students. Also, it complements discussions in his crowdfunding book and crowdfunding course.

Cumming served on the Advisory Committee for the Ontario Securities Commission, 2016-2017. He served on the Small and Medium Sized Enterprises Committee. Cumming served on the Advisory Committee for the National Crowdfunding and Fintech Association of Canada, in 2014-current.

Cumming advised the Canadian Securities Association and Ontario Securities Commission about mutual fund trailer fees in Canada, and carried out empirical work to advise their position on the regulation of mutual fund fees in 2015. The report is here: “A Dissection of Mutual Fund Fees, Flows, and Performance", which gave rise to debates about the use of trailer fees (12b-1 fees) in Canada and subsequent regulatory changes banning trailer fees for certain mutual fund structures in Canada.

Cumming served as Managing Editor-in-Chief of numerous academic journals, including Finance Research Letters "FRL" (2015-2017), the Journal of Corporate Finance "JCF" (2018-2020), the British Journal of Management "BJM" (2020-2022), and the Journal of Industrial and Business Economics "JIBE" (2021-current). FRL's cites/doc increased from 0.653 to 1.222 (87% increase) in the three years he was Managing Editor-in-Chief; JCF's impact factor increased from 2.394 to 4.308 (80% increase) in the three years he was Managing Editor-in-Chief; BJM's cites/doc increased from 3.023 to 6.567 (117% increase) after his first year as Managing Editor-in-Chief; JIBE's cites/doc increased from 0.720 to 1.824 (153% increase) after his first year as Editor-in-Chief.

Cumming is the Founding Managing Editor-in-Chief of the Review of Corporate Finance ("RCF") which started publishing papers in 2021.

Awards and honors 

 2022 – Greater Fort Lauderdale Alliance's "2022 World Class Faculty Award" Winner (video)
 2022 – Clarivate Top 92 Cited Scholars in the World in Business and Economics
 2021 – Helena Yli-Renko Research Impact Award Announcement, Sponsored by the Lloyd Greif Center for Entrepreneurial Studies at the USC Marshall School of Business

 2004 – Winner of the Iddo Sarnat Annual Memorial Award, Best paper published in the Journal of Banking and Finance (JBF) for the paper entitled “A cross-country comparison of full and partial venture capital exits" (with Jeffrey MacIntosh), published in JBF 27 (2003)

Bibliography

Authored Books 

 Cumming, D.J., and S.A. Johan, 2019. Crowdfunding: Fundamental Cases, Facts, and Insights, Elsevier Science Academic Press. (506 pages) Course materials

 Cumming, D.J., and S.A. Johan, 2014. Venture Capital and Private Equity Contracting: An International Perspective, 2nd Edition, Elsevier Science Academic Press. (756 pages)

 Cumming, D.J., N. Dai, and S.A. Johan, 2013. Hedge Fund Structure, Regulation and Performance around the World. Oxford University Press. (300 pages)

 Cumming, D.J., and S.A. Johan, 2009. Venture Capital and Private Equity Contracting: An International Perspective, Elsevier Science Academic Press. (778 pages)

Edited Books 
 Cumming, D.J., S.A. Johan, and G. Wood, 2021. The Oxford Handbook of Hedge Funds, Oxford University Press.
 
 Alexander, C., and D.J. Cumming, 2020. Corruption and Fraud in Financial Markets: Malpractice, Misconduct, and Manipulation.  Wiley Press.

 Cumming, D.J., and L. Hornuf, 2018. The Economics of Crowdfunding: Startups, Portals and Investor Behavior. Palgrave Macmillan. (283 pages)

 Cumming, D.J., and S.A. Johan, 2018. The Oxford Handbook of IPOs, Oxford University Press.

 Cumming, D.J., G. Wood, I. Filatoctchev, and J. Reinecke, 2017. The Oxford Handbook of Sovereign Wealth Funds, Oxford University Press.

 Boubaker, S., D.J. Cumming, D.K. Nguyen, 2017. Research Handbook of Investing in the Triple Bottom Line: Finance, Society and the Environment, Edgar Elgar.

 Boubaker, S., D.J. Cumming, D.K. Nguyen, 2017. Research Handbook of Corporate Finance and Sustainability, Edgar Elgar.

 Cumming, D.J., A. Guariglia (Change to: M. Firth), W. Hou and E. Lee, 2014. Developments in Chinese Entrepreneurship: Key Issues and Challenges, Palgrave MacMillan.

 Cumming, D.J., A. Guariglia (Change to: M. Firth), W. Hou and E. Lee, 2014. Sustainable Entrepreneurship in China: Ethics, Corporate Governance, and Institutional Reforms, Palgrave MacMillan.

 Cumming, D.J., A. Guariglia, W. Hou and E. Lee, 2013. Developing China’s Capital Market: Experiences and Challenges, Palgrave MacMillan. (224 pages)

 Cressy, R., D.J. Cumming, and C. Malin, 2013.  Entrepreneurship, Finance, Governance and Ethics, Springer Press. (455 pages)

 Cumming, D.J., 2013. The Oxford Handbook of Entrepreneurial Finance, Oxford University Press. (930 pages)

 Cumming, D.J., 2013. The Oxford Handbook of Venture Capital, Oxford University Press. (1050 pages)

 Cumming, D.J., 2013. The Oxford Handbook of Private Equity, Oxford University Press. (850 pages)

 Cressy, R., D.J. Cumming, and C. Malin, 2012.  Entrepreneurship, Governance and Ethics, Springer Press. (250 pages)

 Cumming, D.J., 2010. Venture Capital: Investment Strategies, Structures and Policies, Wiley Press. (592 pages)

 Cumming, D.J., 2010. Private Equity: Fund Types, Risks and Returns, and Regulation, Wiley Press. (608 pages)

Selected Book Chapters 
 Cumming, D., R. Dannhauser, S. Johan, 2021. “Reputational Effects of Noncompliance with Financial Market Regulations.” In D. Daniel Sokol and B. van Rooij, eds., The Cambridge Handbook of Compliance, Cambridge University Press, Chapter 19, pp. 245–276.

 Corbett, S., and D. Cumming, 2020. “The Wild West of ICOs” in Shaen Corbet, Andrew Urquhart and Larisa Yarovaya, Eds., Cryptocurrency and Blockchain Technology, De Gruyter, ch.7, pp. 113–130.

 Cumming, D., S. Johan, 2020. “Securities Regulation” in H.K. Baker, ed. Equity Markets, Valuation, and Analysis, John Wiley & Sons, Inc., Chapter 4.

 Cumming, D.J., 2019. “Publishing in Finance versus Entrepreneurship/Management Journals” in T. Clark, M. Wright, and D. Ketchen, eds., How to Get Published in Top Management Journals, Wiley, 2nd ed., Chapter 30, pp. 268–281.

 Cumming, D., S. Johan, 2018. “Law, Culture and Innovation” in Bihong Huang and Xuan Tian, eds. Finance and Innovation: Inclusive and Sustainable Growth,(Add: Asia Pathways.)

 Cumming, D.J., N. Dai, and S. Johan, 2017. “Hedge Fund Organization” in H. Kent Baker and G. Filbeck, eds., Hedge Funds: Structure, Strategy, and Performance, Oxford University Press, Chapter 5.

 Cumming, D., and S. Vismara, 2016. “A Research Journey into Entrepreneurial Finance,” David B. Audretsch & Erik E. Lehmann, eds., Companion to Makers of Modern Entrepreneurship. Routledge, Chapter 7.

Selected Articles in Economics and Finance Journals 
 Cumming, D.J., H. Farag, S. Johan, and D. McGowan, 2022. “The Digital Credit Divide: Marketplace Lending and Entrepreneurship” Journal of Financial and Quantitative Analysis, 57 (7), 2659 - 2692.

 Alperovych, Y., D. Cumming, V. Czellar, A. Groh, 2021. "M&A Rumors about Unlisted Firms" Journal of Financial Economics, 142(3), 1324-1339. Online Appendix to accompany paper.

 Cumming, D.J., G. Leboeuf, and A. Schwienbacher, 2020. “Crowdfunding Models: Keep-it-All vs. All or Nothing”, Financial Management, 49(2) 331-360.  

 Cumming, D.J., B. Haslem, and A. Knill, 2017. “Entrepreneurial Litigation and Venture Capital Finance” Journal of Financial and Quantitative Analysis, 52(5), 2217-2250.  

 Cumming, D.J., S.A. Johan, and D. Li, 2011. “Exchange Trading Rules and Stock Market Liquidity” Journal of Financial Economics 99(3), 651-671.

 Cosh, A., D.J. Cumming, and A. Hughes, 2009. “Outside Entrepreneurial Capital” Economic Journal 119, 1494-1533.  

 Cumming, D.J., 2008. “Contracts and Exits in Venture Capital Finance” Review of Financial Studies 21, 1947-1982.  

 Cumming, D.J., and S.A. Johan, 2008. “Preplanned Exit Strategies in Venture Capital” European Economic Review 52, 1209-1241.

 Cumming, D.J., 2006. “The Determinants of Venture Capital Portfolio Size: Empirical Evidence” Journal of Business 79, 1083-1126.

Cumming, D.J., and J. MacIntosh, 2003. “A Cross-Country Comparison of Full and Partial Venture Capital Exits” Journal of Banking and Finance 27(3), 511-548. [Iddo Sarnat Award best paper published in the Journal of Banking and Finance]

Selected Articles in Management and International Business Journals 
 Cumming, D.J., M. Zhang, 2022. "Bankruptcy Law and Angel Investors around the World" Journal of International Business Studies, forthcoming.

 Cumming, D.J., F. Lopez de Silanes, J. McCahery and A. Schwienbacher, 2020. “Tranching in the Syndicated Loan Market around the World” Journal of International Business Studies, 51, 95–120.

 Cumming, D.J., S. Ji, S.A. Johan, M. Tarsalewska, 2020. “End-of-Day Price Manipulation and M&As” British Journal of Management, 31, 184–205. (and a video about the paper)

 Cumming, D.J., R. Peter, M. Tarsalewska, 2020. “Public to Private Buyouts and Innovation” British Journal of Management, 31(4), 811-829. [ABS 4]

 Cumming, D.J., and M. Zhang, 2019. “Angel Investors around the World” Journal of International Business Studies, 50, 692–719.

 Cumming, D.J., I. Filatoctchev, A. Knill, D. Reeb, and L. Senbet, 2017. “Law, Finance, and the International Mobility of Corporate Governance” Journal of International Business Studies, 48(2), 123-147.

 Cumming, D.J., A. Knill, and K. Syvrud, 2016. “Do International Investors Enhance Private Firm Value? Evidence from Venture Capital” Journal of International Business Studies, 47, 347–373.  

 Cumming, D.J., Tak Yan Leung, and O.M. Rui, 2015. “Gender Diversity and Securities Fraud” Academy of Management Journal, 58(5) 1572-1593. (Best Paper Award at EBES Conference, Featured by the New York Times in April 2014).

 Cumming, D.J., and A. Knill, 2012. “Disclosure, Venture Capital, and Entrepreneurial Spawning” Journal of International Business Studies 43, 563-590. [ABS 4* FT]
 
 Cumming, D.J., and U. Walz, 2010. “Private Equity Returns and Disclosure around the World” Journal of International Business Studies 41(4), 727-754.

Selected Papers in Entrepreneurship and Innovation Journals 
 Cumming, D.J., and L. Hornuf, 2022. "Marketplace Lending of Small and Medium Sized Enterprises" Strategic Entrepreneurship Journal, 16(1) 32-66.

 Bellavitis, C., D.J. Cumming, and T. Vanacker, 2022. “Ban, Boom, and Echo! Entrepreneurship and Initial Coin Offerings” Entrepreneurship Theory and Practice, 46(5), 1136-1169.

 Cumming, D.J., F. Hervé, E. Manthé and A. Schwienbacher, 2022. “Testing-the-Waters Policy with Hypothetical Investment: Evidence from Equity Crowdfunding” Entrepreneurship Theory and Practice, 46 (4), 1019-1053.

 Blaseg, D., D.J. Cumming, and M. Koetter, 2021. "Equity Crowdfunding: High- or Low-Quality Entrepreneurs?" Entrepreneurship Theory and Practice, 45(3) 505–530.

 Cumming, D.J., M. Meoli, S. Vismara, 2019. “Investors’ choices between cash and voting rights: Evidence from dual-class equity crowdfunding,” Research Policy, 48(8), Article 103740. 

 Cumming, D.J., and S. Johan, 2017. “The Problems with and Promise of Entrepreneurial Finance” Strategic Entrepreneurship Journal 11, 357-370.

 Ahlers, G.K.C., D.J. Cumming, C. Guenther, and D. Schweizer, 2015. “Signaling in Equity Crowdfunding” Entrepreneurship Theory and Practice, 39, 955-980. (Australian Venture Capital and Private Equity Association Best Paper Award; 2021 Helena Yli-Renko Research Impact Award, sponsored by the Lloyd Greif Center for Entrepreneurial Studies at the USC Marshall School of Business).

 Cumming, D.J., and N. Dai, 2013. “Why do Entrepreneurs Switch Lead Venture Capitalists?” Entrepreneurship Theory and Practice, 37, 999-1017. (Bank of Canada Best Paper Award on Canadian Financial Institutions, Northern Finance Association 2011).

 Cumming, D.J., and E. Fischer, 2012. “Publicly Funded Business Advisory Services and Entrepreneurial Outcomes” Research Policy 41, 467-481.

 Cumming, D.J., D. Schmidt and U. Walz, 2010. “Legality and Venture Capital Governance around the World” Journal of Business Venturing 25, 54-72.

Selected Articles in Law, Economics, and Policy Journals 
 Cumming, D.J., S. Johan, Y. Zhang, 2018. “Public Policy Towards Entrepreneurial Finance: Spillovers and the Scale-up Gap” Oxford Review of Economic Policy, 34, 652-675.

 Carpentier, C., D.J. Cumming, and J.M. Suret, 2012. “The Value of Capital Market Regulation: IPOs versus Reverse Mergers” Journal of Empirical Legal Studies 9, 56-91.

 Cumming, D.J., and N. Dai, 2009. “Capital Flows and Hedge Fund Regulation” Journal of Empirical Legal Studies 6, 848-873.

 Cumming, D.J., and S. Johan, 2008 “Global Market Surveillance” American Law and Economics Review 10, 454-506.

 Armour, J., and D.J. Cumming, 2008. “Bankruptcy Law and Entrepreneurship” American Law and Economics Review 10, 303-350. Reviewed in James Surowiecki, April 7, 2008, “Going for Broke” in The New Yorker.

 Cumming, D.J., and S.A. Johan, 2008. “Hedge Fund Forum Shopping” University of Pennsylvania Journal of Business Law 10(4), 783-831. (Lead Article).

 Armour, J., and D.J. Cumming, 2006. “The Legislative Road to Silicon Valley” Oxford Economic Papers 58, 596-635.

 Cumming, D.J., and J. MacIntosh, 2003. “Venture Capital Exits in Canada and the United States” University of Toronto Law Journal 53, 101-200.

 Cumming, D.J., and J. MacIntosh, 2002. "The Rationales Underlying Reincorporation and Implications for Canadian Corporations" International Review of Law and Economics 22(3), 277-330.

 Cumming, D.J., and J. MacIntosh, 2000. "The Role of Interjurisdictional Competition in Shaping Canadian Corporate Law" International Review of Law and Economics 20(2): 141-186. (Lead Article)

External links 

 Douglas Cumming
 Douglas Cumming publications indexed by Google Scholar
 Sofia Johan

References 

1970 births
21st-century Canadian economists
Living people
Writers from Winnipeg